Roberto Straal (born 19 December 1966) is a Dutch former professional footballer who played as a defender. He played for Eerste Divisie and Eredivisie clubs De Graafschap, Vitesse, MVV Maastricht and SC Heerenveen and for German clubs Arminia Bielefeld and BSV Schwarz-Weiß Rehden.

References

External links
Voetbal International profile

Living people
1966 births
Footballers from Arnhem
Dutch footballers
Association football defenders
Eredivisie players
Eerste Divisie players
Bundesliga players
2. Bundesliga players
SC Heerenveen players
De Graafschap players
SBV Vitesse players
MVV Maastricht players
Arminia Bielefeld players
BSV Schwarz-Weiß Rehden players
Dutch expatriate footballers
Dutch expatriate sportspeople in Germany
Expatriate footballers in Germany